Liberius may refer to:

 Liberius of Ravenna (d. 200), Bishop of Ravenna and saint
 Pope Liberius (died 366), Bishop of Rome
 Liberius (praetorian prefect) (c. 465 – c. 554), Roman government administrator
 Oliver of Ancona or Liberius (died c. 1050), immigrant religious leader in Italy
 Liberius, a character in Doctor Zhivago

See also
 Liberalis (disambiguation)